Events in the year 1960 in Mexico.

Incumbents 
 President — Adolfo López Mateos (1909-1969), president 1958-1964

Cabinet
 Interior Secretary: Gustavo Díaz Ordaz (1911-1979)
 Foregin Relations Secretary: Manuel Tello Baurraud (1898-1971)
 Defense Secretary: Agustín Olachea (1890-1974)
 Navy Secretary: Manuel Zermeño Araico 
 Treasury Secretary: Antonio Ortiz Mena (1907-2007)
 Secretary of the Presidencia: Donato Miranda Fonseca (1908-1995)
 Public Works Secretary: Luis Enrique Bracamontes (1923-2003)
 National Heritage Secretary: Eduardo Bustamante
 Secretary Industry and Commerce: Raúl Salinas Lozano (1917-2004)
 Secretary de Agriculture and Livestock: Julián Rodríguez Adame
 Secretary of Water Resources: Alfredo del Mazo Vélez (1904–1975)
 Secretary of Communications and Transportation: Walter Cross Buchanan (1906-1977)
 Education Secretary: Jaime Torres Bodet (1902-1974)
 Secretary of Health and Assistance: José Álvarez Amézquita
 Secretariat of Labor and Social Welfare: Salomón González Blanco (1900-1992)
 Attorney General of Mexico: Fernando López Arias (1905-1978)
 Regent of the Federal District Department: Ernesto P. Uruchurtu (1906-1997)

Supreme Court
 President: Alfonso Guzmán Neyra

Governors
Every governor was a member of the Institutional Revolutionary Party, PRI.

 Aguascalientes: Luis Ortega Douglas
 Baja California: Eligio Esquivel Méndez
 Campeche: Alberto Trueba Urbina
 Chiapas: Samuel León Brindis
 Chihuahua: Teófilo Borunda (1912-2001)
 Coahuila: Raúl Madero González
 Colima: Rodolfo Chávez Carrillo
 Durango: Francisco González de la Vega (1901-1976)
 Guanajuato: J. Jesús Rodríguez Gaona
 Guerrero: Raúl Caballero Aburto	
 Hidalgo: Alfonso Corona del Rosal
 Jalisco: Juan Preciado
 State of Mexico: Gustavo Baz Prada (1894-1987)
 Michoacán: David Franco Rodríguez
 Morelos: Norberto López Avelar
 Nayarit: Francisco García Montero
 Nuevo León: Raúl Rangel Frías
 Oaxaca: Alfonso Pérez Gasca
 Puebla
Fausto M. Ortega (term 1957-1960)
Arturo Fernández Aguirre (term 1960-1965)
 Querétaro: Juan C. Gorraéz (1904-1908)
 San Luis Potosí: Manuel López Dávila
 Sinaloa: Gabriel Leyva Velásquez
 Sonora: Álvaro Obregón Tapia (1916-1993)
 Tabasco: Carlos A. Madrazo (1915-1969)
 Tamaulipas: Norberto Treviño Zapata	
 Tlaxcala: Joaquín Cisneros Molina
 Veracruz: Antonio María Quirasco
 Yucatán: Agustín Franco Aguilar
 Zacatecas: Francisco E. García
 South Territory of Baja California: Bonifacio Salinas Leal
 Federal Territory of Quintana Roo: Aarón Merino Fernández
Regent of the Federal District: Ernesto P. Uruchurtu

Population
 38,174,112 (19,156,559 women, 19,017,553 men)

Events
 January 1: Creation of ISSSTE, which provides health and other services for governmental employees.
 January 31: Estadio Jalisco with a capacity for 47,829 fans, opens in Guadalajara.
 February 18: The Latin American Free Trade Association is created by Argentina, Brazil, Chile, Mexico, Paraguay, Pero, and Uruguay in Montevideo. The LAFTA was replaced by the Latin American Integration Association in 1980.
 June 1: In a record that still stands, a 114-pound roosterfish was caught by fisherman Abe Sackheim at La Paz, Baja California Sur.
 August 25 to September 11: Mexico sends 69 athletes to the 1960 Summer Olympics in Rome. Juan Botella (1941-1970) won a bronze medal in the men's springboard event.
 September 21: President Adolfo López Mateos nationalizes the electrical system.
 October 7: Isidro Fabela is awarded the Belisario Domínguez Medal of Honor.
 Artist Lilia Carrillo marries Mexican abstract artist Manuel Felguérez in Washington, DC.
 November 20: In honor of the 50th anniversary of the Mexican Revolution, the remains of president Francisco I. Madero are transferred from the French cemetery where he was buried to the Monument to the Revolution.
 December 30: 17-19 people are killed and 100 injured as the Mexican Army, under orders of the governor of Guerrero, open fire on striking students in Chilpancingo.
 Date unknown: 
Ediciones Era is founded by Vicente Rojo Almazán, José Azorín; Tomás Espresate Pons, and his brothers.
 Painter and sculptor Pedro Coronel wins the José Clemente Orozco Prize at the II Inter-American Biennial in Mexico. Also in 1960 he exhibited 54 paintings and 8 sculptures at the Palacio de Bellas Artes in Mexico City.
 Gustavo Arias Murueta begins his artistic career.
 Artists Chucho Reyes and María Teresa Vieyra present an exhibition in the Colectiva de Artistas Noveles at the Galería Argos.

Awards
Belisario Domínguez Medal of Honor – Isidro Fabela
National Prize for Arts and Sciences in History, Social Sciences, and Philosophy: Alfonso Caso

Movies

 Macario, a 1960 Mexican supernatural drama film directed by Roberto Gavaldón and starring Ignacio López Tarso and Pina Pellicer is the first Mexican film to be nominated for an Academy Award for Best Foreign Language Film. It was also entered into the 1960 Cannes Film Festival and the San Francisco International Film Festival.
 Pepe directed by George Sidney and starring Cantinflas is nominated for seven Academy Awards but is a failure at the box office.
 The Magnificent Seven is a western movie directed by John Sturges, set in a small village in Mexico, and filmed at Estudios Churubusco, Mexico City; in Cuernavaca and Tepoztlan, Morelos; in Durango, Durango; and localities in Sonora.
 To Each His Life (Spanish:Cada quién su vida), a drama film directed by Julio Bracho and starring Ana Luisa Peluffo, Emma Fink and Carlos Navarro.

Sports
 Soccer
 1960 Panamerican Championship was played in San José, Costa Rica, between March 6 and March 20; Mexico took 3rd place.
 1959–60 Copa México started on March 6, and concluded on April 17, 1960, with the final held at the Estadio Olímpico Universitario in Mexico City, in which Necaxa defeated Tampico Madero 4–1.
 1959–60 Mexican Primera División season was won by C.D. Guadalajara.
 Baseball: The Tigres won the Mexican baseball league championship.
 Tennis: Mexican Rafael Osuna and American Dennis Ralston won the Wimbledon Men's Doubles championship.
 Auto racing: Ricardo Rodríguez (1942-1962) partnered with André Pilette from Belgium in the 1960 24 Hours of Le Mans, where they took 2nd place. At the age of 18, Rodríguez was the youngest driver ever to stand on the podium at Le Mans.

Music
 Rock! was the debut album of Los Locos del Ritmo, recorded at Discos Orfeón. It was the first Spanish-language rock LP and included songs such as Nena no me importa ("Baby, I don't care") by Jerry Leiber and Mike Stoller and Pedro Pistolas ("Peter Gunn") by Henry Mancini.
 Los Teen Tops, which included singer Enrique Guzmán, released their first single (78 rpm) in May, including La Plaga (Spanish adaptation of Little Richard's "Good Golly, Miss Molly") and El Rock de la Cárcel (Spanish adaptation of Elvis Presley's "Jailhouse Rock"), recorded at Columbia Records.
 Armando Manzanero recorded Voy a Apagar la Luz ("I'm going to turn off the light") in 1960.
 César Costa was a part of the group Los Camisas Negras, which recorded several singles and an LP on Musart, including El Tigre ("Tiger" by Fabian), Mona Lisa (originally by Carl Mann) and Osito Teddy Elvis's "Teddy Bear".
 Los Checkers were formed in 1960 and changed their name to Los Twisters in 1961.
 Los Crazy Boys began in January 1960 under the leadership of Jesús Martínez “Palillo”. In May they recorded their first single, with Leroy and Trátame Bien ("Treat Me Well") Their first LP was recorded in November, and it was called, Rock con los Crazy Boys.

Notable births
 January 3 – Alejandro Illescas, voice actor (d. 2008)
 January 10 – Negro Casas, professional wrestler
 March 13 – Alejandro Filio, singer.
 March 15 – Rosa Beltrán, Mexican writer, lecturer, and academic.
March 21 – Juan Manuel Oliva, Governor of Guanajuato 2006-2012.
April 22 – Benjamín Gallegos Soto, pilot and politician , Senator from Aguascalientes (d. 2018).
May 3 – Odiseo Bichir, actor.
June 23 – Fernanda Tapia, announcer, presenter, producer, screenwriter, lecturer, singer and voice actress
 July 31 – Pablo Larios, "El Arquero de la Selva" (The Goalkeeper of the Jungle) was a football goalkeeper from 1980 to 1999. He played on the Mexico National Team from 1983-1991 (d. 2019).
September 4 – Arturo Chávez Chávez, politician , Attorney General of Mexico, 2009-2011
 September 25 – Eduardo Yáñez, film and television actor.
 August 30 – Chalino Sánchez Félix, musician (d. 1992)
November 12 – Emilio González Márquez, Governor of Jalisco 2007–2013
 December 6 – Marco Antonio Adame, Governor of Morelos  2006-2012
December 15 – Tomás Torres Mercado, politician , federal deputy (2012-2015), (d. October 22, 2015).

Notable deaths
 January 17: Manuel González Serrano, painter (b. 1917)
 February 26: General Pedro Rodríguez Triana, soldier during the Mexican Revolution (b. 1890)
 March 19: Cándido Aguilar Vargas, soldier who fought in the Mexican Revolution, son-in-law of Venustiano Carranza (b. 1888)
 March 27: Mario Talavera, Mexican songwriter (b. 1885)
 April 11: César López de Lara, general during the Mexican Revolution, governor of Tamaulipas 1921-1923 (b. 1890)
 July 14: Elpidio Ramírez ("El Viejo Elpidio"), revolutionary, violinist, and composer (b. 1882)
 July 16: Manuel Gamio,  Mexican anthropologist and archaeologist (b. 1883)
 July 18: Roberto Soto ("El Panzón Soto"), comic actor (b. 1888)
 September 7: Alfonso Ortiz Tirado, tenor and orthopedic surgeon (b. 1893)
 September 8: General Adalberto Tejeda Olivares, Governor of Veracruz 1920-1924 & 1928-1932 (b. 1883)
 October 1: Chula Prieto (María del Carmen Prieto Salido), actress (b. 1929)
 December 19: José María Castellanos Urrutia, educator and politician in Colima (b. 1887)

References

External links

 
Years of the 20th century in Mexico
Mexico